Joey Martin may refer to:

Joey Martin (ice hockey) (born 1988), Canadian professional ice hockey player
Joe Martin, member of the husband and wife duo Joey + Rory
Jake Martin (All My Children), a fictitious character on the series originally known as Joey Martin

See also
Joe Martin (disambiguation)
Joseph Martin (disambiguation)